Flavoparmelia soredians is a widely distributed species of foliose lichen in the large family Parmeliaceae.

In the late 1990s, an increase in the frequency of Flavoparmelia soredians was noted in the Netherlands, which, until then, occurred rarely in the country. This population increase followed a decrease in the levels of the pollutant sulphur dioxide. Punctelia borreri and Flavoparmelia caperata were two other foliose species that experienced a similar increase in regional frequency during this time.

Taxonomy
The lichen was first formally described by Finnish lichenologist William Nylander in 1872 as Parmelia soredians. Mason Hale transferred it to the genus Pseudoparmelia in 1974. It was later one of 17 species he transferred to Flavoparmelia in 1986.

References

Parmeliaceae
Lichen species
Lichens of Asia
Lichens of Europe
Lichens of South America
Lichens described in 1872
Taxa named by William Nylander (botanist)